A notifiable disease is one which that has to be reported to the government authorities as required by law. In Sweden, over 50 diseases are classified as notifiable.  The notifiable diseases come under four categories : notifiable, mandatory contact tracing required, dangerous to public health (allmänsfarliga) and dangerous to the society (samhällsfarliga).  As per the Swedish law, notifiable diseases should be reported by the laboratories, doctor treating the patient or performing autopsy. The report is sent through an electronic system called SmiNet to the Public Health Agency of Sweden.  As of January 2018, the only three diseases classified as dangerous to society are small pox, Ebola and severe acute respiratory syndrome (SARS).

List of notifiable diseases

References

Health law in Sweden
Public health
Sweden